Travis Burns may refer to:
 Travis Burns (actor), an Australian actor in Neighbours
 Travis Burns (rugby league), an Australian NRL player
Travis Burns, a convicted murderer from New Zealand